Antimony(III) oxide hydroxide nitrate is an inorganic compound with the chemical formula Sb4O4(OH)2(NO3)2. It is one of the very few nitrates of antimony. No evidence for a simple trinitrate has been reported. According to X-ray crystallography, its structure consists of cationic layers of antimony oxide/hydroxide with intercalated nitrate anions. This compound is produced by the reaction of antimony(III) oxide and nitric acid and 110 °C.

References

Antimony(III) compounds
Nitrates